Croker Island is an island in the Arafura Sea off the coast of the Northern Territory, Australia,  northeast of Darwin. It was the site of the Croker Island Mission between 1940 and 1968.

Indigenous peoples
At the earliest time of European contact, the Indigenous people of Croker Island were the Jaako, an Aboriginal Australian people who spoke Marrgu, a language isolate. The modern Indigenous communities speak Iwaidja (the approximately 150 speakers being the last remaining speakers of the language) and Maung, Kunwinjku and English.

Post-contact history

1940–1968: Croker Island Mission

Between 1940 and 1968, the Methodist Overseas Mission operated the Croker Island Mission at Minjilang.

The Pacific theatre of World War II saw the Japanese military aerial bombing Darwin in February 1942.  Non-Indigenous children from the island were evacuated. To avoid the bombing, missionary Margaret Somerville led 95 Indigenous children from the island's orphanage, part of the Croker Island Mission, on a journey that saw the party arrive on the Australian mainland. Travelling a distance overland, they boarded a train through central Australia, arriving in Sydney, New South Wales, on the east coast. Over 44 days, the group covered . The children returned to Croker Island in 1946.

This expedition was described by Somerville in her book They crossed a continent, and later explored in the ABC documentary Croker Island Exodus (2012), directed and co-written by Steven McGregor and co-written by Danielle MacLean. Locals were cast to play all of the roles.

2001: Croker Island native title claim 

The traditional custodians of Croker Island filed a claim over the sea surrounding Croker Island in 2001. The case, Yarmirr v Northern Territory (named after the lead claimant, Mary Yarmirr), was settled in the High Court of Australia on 11 October 2001. The clans represented were the Mandilarri-Ildugij, Mangalara, Murran, Gadura-Minaga and Ngaynjaharr clans. The case established that the traditional owners do have native title of the sea and sea-bed; however, common law rights of fishing and navigation mean that only non-exclusive native title can exist over the sea.

2005: Cyclone Ingrid
Croker Island was severely damaged by Cyclone Ingrid in March 2005.

Geography
In the north and east is the Arafura Sea, and in the south and southeast Mountnorris Bay. Croker Island is the largest island, and the only permanently inhabited island, in the Croker Group.

Settlements
The only notable settlement on Croker Island is the Aboriginal community of Minjilang, located on Mission Bay on the east coast. Apart from that, there are nine small family outstations, the largest one of which is Inngirnatj (Point David) at the southern end of the island. The settlements from north to south:

Alamirra (close to Somerville Bay 1.5 km further the north)
Timor Springs (north of Minjilang, 8 km by road)
Wanakutja (on Palm Bay in the north-west)
Minjilang (Mission Bay), the only village and main settlement of the island
Adjamarrago (800 metres north of Croker Island Aerodrome, west of Minjilang)
Keith William's Outstation (Arrgamumu, Arrgamurrmur) (south-east of Mission Bay)
Walka (Barge Landing) (south side of Mission Bay, with barge pier)
Sandy Bay (close to Sandy Bay on the east coast, but two kilometres to the coast)
Marramarrani (southwest coast)
Inngirnatj (Point David) (southern end, west side, with boat pier)

Environment

The island's beaches, bushland, wetlands and swamps are host to plentiful wildlife and flora.

A cull of feral horses was undertaken in 2015.

References

Arafura Sea
Islands of the Northern Territory
Arnhem Land tropical savanna